Cixian railway station is a station on Beijing–Guangzhou railway in Ci County, Handan, Hebei.

History
The station was opened in 1904. Passenger service ended in 2018.

References

Railway stations in Hebei
Stations on the Beijing–Guangzhou Railway
Railway stations in China opened in 1904